Mohamed Ben Fredj (born 9 May 2000) is a professional footballer who plays as a forward for  club Le Puy, on loan from Auxerre. Born in France, he is a former Tunisia youth international.

Club career
Ben Fredj began his senior career with the reserve side of Marseille in 2017. He transferred to Auxerre on 14 June 2020. He made his professional debut with Auxerre in a 3–0 Ligue 2 loss to Pau FC on 20 April 2021.

On 30 July 2022, Ben Fredj moved on loan to Le Puy.

International career
Born in France, Ben Fredj is of Tunisian descent. He was called up to represent the Tunisia U23s for some friendlies in June 2019.

References

External links
 
 OM 1899 Profile

2000 births
Living people
Sportspeople from Toulon
Citizens of Tunisia through descent
Tunisian footballers
Association football forwards
Tunisia youth international footballers
French footballers
French sportspeople of Tunisian descent
AJ Auxerre players
Le Puy Foot 43 Auvergne players
Ligue 2 players
Championnat National 2 players
Footballers from Provence-Alpes-Côte d'Azur